The 1998 European Tour was the 27th official season of golf tournaments known as the PGA European Tour.

The season was made up of 33 tournaments counting for the Order of Merit, and several non-counting "Approved Special Events".

The Order of Merit was won by Scotland's Colin Montgomerie for the sixth year in succession.

Changes for 1998
For the first time the schedule included the Masters Tournament, U.S. Open and PGA Championship, although winnings did not count towards the Order of Merit. There were several changes from the previous season with the addition of the Qatar Masters, the return of the Belgian Open, and the loss of the Dimension Data Pro-Am.

In March, the Chemapol Trophy Czech Open was cancelled in the wake of severe floods across the country in July 1997; it was later replaced on the schedule by the German Open. In July, the tour announced the cancellation of the Oki Pro-Am.

Schedule
The following table lists official events during the 1998 season.

Unofficial events
The following events were sanctioned by the European Tour, but did not carry official money, nor were wins official.

Order of Merit
The Order of Merit was titled as the Volvo Order of Merit and was based on prize money won during the season, calculated in Pound sterling.

Awards

See also
List of golfers with most European Tour wins

Notes

References

External links
1998 season results on the PGA European Tour website
1998 Order of Merit on the PGA European Tour website

European Tour seasons
European Tour